St. Petersburg, Florida, held an election for mayor on November 9, 2005. , this was the last time a Republican was elected Mayor of St. Petersburg.

Results

References

2005
2005 Florida elections
Mayoral election, 2005
St. Petersburg